Rocky Comfort Creek is a  tributary of the Ogeechee River in the U.S. state of Georgia.

The name "Rocky Comfort Creek" most likely is an English translation of its Native American Indian-language name.

See also
List of rivers of Georgia

References 

USGS Hydrologic Unit Map - State of Georgia (1974)

Rivers of Georgia (U.S. state)
Rivers of Warren County, Georgia
Rivers of Glascock County, Georgia
Rivers of Jefferson County, Georgia